Noapara may refer to:
 Noapara, Bangladesh
 Noapara, North 24 Parganas, a census town in Barrackpore I CD Block, West Bengal, India
 Noapara, Baranagar, a neighbourhood in Baranagar municipal area, West Bengal, India
 Noapara metro station and depot, a metro railway station in Baranagar
 Noapara (Vidhan Sabha constituency), West Bengal, India